Bibiana Perez (born 31 October 1970) is an Italian former alpine skier who competed in the 1992 Winter Olympics, 1994 Winter Olympics, and 1998 Winter Olympics.

References

External links
 

1970 births
Living people
Italian female alpine skiers
Olympic alpine skiers of Italy
Alpine skiers at the 1992 Winter Olympics
Alpine skiers at the 1994 Winter Olympics
Alpine skiers at the 1998 Winter Olympics